FabricLive.83 is a 2015 DJ mix album by English DJ Logan Sama. The album was released as part of the FabricLive Mix Series.

In a first for the series, FABRICLIVE 83 was also made available on vinyl. The vinyl pressing contains all 24 exclusive instrumentals created for the mix presented as a quadruple-disc LP. The CD edition features all 24 vocal versions, while the digital edition contained both versions of the release.

Background and recording
Logan Sama spent a period of several months contacting grime producers asking them to create new instrumentals for the mix as well as contacting emcees collecting acapella bars. A mix was then created that stitched together instrumentals and accapellas in the style of a grime pirate radio set. The resulting mix featured 24 producers and 66 emcees from across the history of the genre.

Track listing

References

External links
Fabric: FabricLive.83

Fabric (club) albums
2015 compilation albums